Alder is an abandoned town located in Saguache County, Colorado, United States.

A post office called Alder was established in 1881, and remained in operation until 1927. The community takes its name from nearby Alder Creek.

References

Populated places in Saguache County, Colorado